Ruatāhuna is a small town in the remote country of Te Urewera, in the northeast of New Zealand's North Island. It is 90 kilometres directly west of Gisborne, and 18 kilometres northwest of Lake Waikaremoana. By road, it is 50 kilometres south-east of Murupara, and 110 kilometres north-west of Wairoa. It is on the upper reaches of the Whakatāne River, and surrounded on three sides by the Te Urewera protected area, formerly the Te Urewera National Park. The road that runs from Murupara through Ruatahuna to Āniwaniwa on Lake Waikaremoana, a large part of which is unsealed, used to be designated as part of State Highway 38. It is a subdivision of the Galatea-Murupara ward of the Whakatāne District.

History 

The area was the site of much action during the New Zealand Wars of the 1860s and 1870s. From 1870 to 1888, one of the largest wharenui ever built, Te Whai-a-te-Motu, was constructed for Te Kooti and his followers.

Marae

Ruatāhuna is within the rohe (tribal area) of Tūhoe, and has several marae affiliated with Tūhoe hapū:

 Kākānui (Tīpapa) marae and Kākahu Tāpiki meeting house, affiliated with Kākahu Tāpiki.
 Mātaatua marae and Te Whai-a-te-Motu meeting house, affiliated with Te Urewera.
 Ōhāua or Ōhāua te Rangi marae and Te Poho-o-Pōtiki meeting house, affiliated with Ngāti Rongo.
 Ōpūtao marae and Te Ngāwari meeting house, affiliated with Ngāti Tāwhaki.
 Ōtekura marae and Te Ōhāki meeting house, affiliated with Tamakaimoana.
 Pāpueru marae and Te Whatu o Te Kanohi meeting house, affiliated with Ngāti Tāwhaki.
 Tātāhoata marae and Te Tapuae meeting house, affiliated with Ngāi Te Riu.
 Te Umuroa marae and Te Poho-o-Parahaki meeting house, affiliated with Ngāti Manunui.
 Uwhiārae marae and Te Paena meeting house, affiliated with Ngāi Te Paena.
 Te Wai-iti marae and Te Poho o Kurī Kino meeting house, affiliated with Ngāti Kurī Kino.

In October 2020, the Government committed $3,996,258 from the Provincial Growth Fund to upgrade Kākānui, Mātaatua, Ōhāua, Pāpueru, Tātāhoata, Uwhiārae, Te Wai-iti marae, creating 79 jobs.

Education

References

Whakatane District
Populated places in the Bay of Plenty Region